Eugène-Claude Ekobo N'Joh (born 15 February 1981) is a Cameroonian former professional footballer who played as a defender or midfielder. He left Cameroon to join Swiss club FC Sion and went on to spend his career in France.

Honours
Vannes
 Coupe de la Ligue: runner-up 2008–09

References

External links
 

1981 births
Living people
Association football midfielders
Association football defenders
Cameroonian footballers
Cameroon international footballers
Cameroonian expatriate footballers
Swiss Super League players
Ligue 2 players
FC Sion players
AS Beauvais Oise players
US Créteil-Lusitanos players
RC Strasbourg Alsace players
LB Châteauroux players
Vannes OC players
Clermont Foot players
Cameroonian expatriates in France
Expatriate footballers in Switzerland
Expatriate footballers in France